Kimberly Nicole Morgan (born February 22, 1983) is an American singer,  educator, and pageant titleholder. Morgan was crowned Miss Mississippi on July 14, 2007, becoming just the second African American woman to win that title. Morgan was a Top 16 semi-finalist at the 2008 Miss America pageant. She is an alumna of Alcorn State University.

Born in Oxford, Mississippi and raised in the small community of Taylor, Morgan, who grew up with a severe hearing disability, was a music teacher at Madison S. Palmer High School in Marks, Mississippi prior to her becoming Miss Mississippi. After her one-year reign she has returned to the field of education.  Morgan is a graduate of Alcorn State University and was 'Miss ASU' 2004–2005. In 2005, while a student in college, she performed as part of the Alcorn State University Concert Choir at the inaugural ceremony of President George W. Bush. She is a member of Zeta Phi Beta sorority.

Morgan's platform as Miss Mississippi was G.O.T.M.I.L.K.! (Golden Opportunity Toward Music Increasing Literacy in Kids), a fifty-five-minute-per-week after-school program of music instructions. Morgan participated in the TLC reality show Miss America: Reality Check.

References

External links
Footage of Kimberly Morgan's crowning as Miss Mississippi 2007
Complete biographical information
Photo gallery
Miss America 2008 delegate information
Miss Mississippi to participate in reality show 12/27/07

1983 births
Living people
Miss America 2008 delegates
People from Oxford, Mississippi
Alcorn State University alumni
Miss Mississippi winners